Derick de Souza da Silva (born 23 April 1998) is a Brazilian track and field athlete who specializes in sprint. Representing Brazil at the 2019 World Athletics Championships, he was part of Brazil's team that qualified to the final in men's 4 × 100 metres relay. He competed at the 2020 Summer Olympics.

Personal bests
100 m: 10.10 (wind: +0.2 m/s) –  Guadalajara, 6 Jul 2018
200 m: 20.23 (wind: +1.6 m/s) –  Auburn, 21 Apr 2018
4x100 m relay: 37.72 –  Doha, 5 Oct 2019

References

External links

Brazilian male sprinters
1998 births
Living people
World Athletics Championships athletes for Brazil
Pan American Games medalists in athletics (track and field)
Pan American Games gold medalists for Brazil
Athletes (track and field) at the 2019 Pan American Games
Medalists at the 2019 Pan American Games
Troféu Brasil de Atletismo winners
Athletes (track and field) at the 2020 Summer Olympics
Olympic athletes of Brazil
Athletes from Rio de Janeiro (city)
21st-century Brazilian people